The 27th Annual Japan Record Awards took place at the Nippon Budokan in Chiyoda, Tokyo, December 31, 1985, starting at 6:30PM JST. The primary ceremonies were televised in Japan on TBS.

Award winners 
Japan Record Award:
Akina Nakamori for "Meu amor é..."
1st runner-up: The Checkers for ジュリアに傷心
2nd runner-up: Anzen Chitai for 悲しみにさよなら
Best Vocalist:
Sayuri Ishikawa
Best Star:
The Checkers
Best New Artist:
Miho Nakayama
Best Album:
Yōsui Inoue for "9.5 carat"

External links
Official Website

Japan Record Awards
Japan Record Awards
Japan Record Awards
Japan Record Awards
1985